Sandwip is an upazila of Chattogram District in Chattogram Division, Bangladesh. It encompasses the islands of Sandwip and Urir Char.

History 

Sandwip Thana's status was upgraded to an upazila (sub-district level) in 1984. The construction works of a Bangladesh Navy fleet headquarters at the Sandwip Channel with ship berthing facilities is also going on as part of the Forces Goal 2030. In 2010, the Government of Bangladesh announced a plan to build a dam in Urir Char to reclaim land as it had suffered greatly from Tropical Storm One and the 1991 Bangladesh cyclone among other natural disasters.

Geography

It has a total area of 762.42 km2.

Demographics
According to the 1991 Bangladesh census, Sandwip had a population of 272,179. Males constituted 49.68% of the population, and females 50.32%. The population aged 18 or over was 122,499. Sandwip had an average literacy rate of 35% (7+ years), against the national average of 32.4%.

Sandwip has 45, 389 households.

Administration
Sandwip Upazila is divided into the Sandwip Municipality and 15 union parishads: Amanullah, Azimpur, Bauria, Digghapar, Gachhua, Haramia, Harispur, Kalapania, Magdhara, Maitbhanga, Musapur, Rahmatpur, Santoshpur, Sarikait, and Urirchar. The union parishads are subdivided into 39 mouzas and 34 villages.

Sandwip Municipality is subdivided into 9 wards and 10 mahallas.

List of chairmen and rulers

Education
There are 28 secondary schools in Sandwip Upazila. Some these include:
Kargil Government High School, the oldest school in the Upazila founded in 1879
Gachua Adarsha High School, established in 1987
Bauria Golam Khalek Academy
Gasua a k Academy
Sandwip Public High School
In total, the Upazila has 149 state primary schools, one junior high school, 4 colleges, 1 girls college, 19 kindergartens and 3 girls high schools. There are 9 dakhil madrasas, 3 alim madrasas, 3 fazil madrasas and four Kamil madrasas. Notable madrasas include the Bashiria Ahmadia Alhaj Abu Bakar Sidiqque Fazil Madrasa, founded in 1902, and the Kashgar Islamia Fazil Madrasa which was founded in 1929. The upazila has a literacy rate of 51.5%.

Facilities
The upazila is home to 10 orphanages, including one governmental orphanage. It also has 295 mosques which serve the majority Sunni Muslim population that inhabit the sub-district. Some notable mosques include the Shahabanu Mosque, Faqir Shah mosque, the Sandwip Town Jame Mosque, Sandwip Town Bazar Mosque and the Abdul Ghani Chowdhury Mosque. There are 32 haat bazaars and two canals. 26 post offices and 10 banks can also be found here.

Notable people
 Chowdhury Abu Torab Khan, leader of Bengal's first anti-British uprising
 Abul Kashem Sandwip, educationist and a founder of Bangladesh Betar
 Abdul Haq
 Abdul Hakim, 17th-century poet
 Abul Fazal Ziaur Rahman, physician and army officer
 AKM Asadul Haq, physician and army officer
 AKM Rafiq Ullah Choudhury, politician and language activist
 Alhaz Mustafizur Rahman, politician 
 Belal Muhammad, a founder of Swadhin Bangla Betar Kendra
 Belayet Hossain, Bangladeshi freedom fighter
 Chowdhury Hasan Sarwardy, former lieutenant general of the Bangladesh Army
 Dilal Khan, final independent ruler of Sandwip
 Mahfuzur Rahaman, politician 
 M. Obaidul Huq, politician 
 Mostafa Kamal Pasha, politician 
 Muzaffar Ahmad, politician and journalist
 Mohammed Didarul Alam
 Shamsuddin Qasemi, Islamic scholar and politician
 Lalmohan Sen, revolutionary involved in the Chittagong armoury raid
 Mohit Kamal, psychotherapist

See also
 Upazilas of Bangladesh
 Districts of Bangladesh
 Divisions of Bangladesh

Notes

References

Sandwip Upazila